The Guitar & Banjo of Reverend Gary Davis is an album by blues musician Reverend Gary Davis recorded in 1964 and released on the Prestige Folklore label.

Reception

AllMusic reviewer Richie Unterberger stated: "Because this is an all-instrumental recording, it's an offbeat entry into the catalog of a performer known both as an important guitarist and as a singer. Some might miss Davis' vocals on this 1964 recording, but on the other hand there are plenty of records with him singing around. This gives listeners a chance to hone in on [sic] his dexterous guitar skills, blending ragtime, folk, and blues, usually on guitar (though he plays banjo on a couple of songs, and harmonica on one). ... not the best format for his strengths, certainly, but an illustration of his ability to adapt his style to unexpected material".

Track listing
All compositions by Gary Davis except where noted
 "Maple Leaf Rag" (Scott Joplin) – 2:58
 "Slow Drag" – 2:27
 "The Boy Was Kissing the Girl (and Playing the Guitar the Same Time)" – 2:42
 "Candy Man" – 2:54
 "United States March" (Traditional) – 6:31
 "Devil's Dream" (Traditional) – 3:50
 "The Coon Hunt" (Traditional) – 3:32
 "Mister Jim" – 4:15
 "Please Baby" – 3:18
 "Fast Fox Trot" – 2:22
 "Can't Be Satisfied" – 2:55

Personnel

Performance
Reverend Gary Davis – guitar, banjo, harmonica

Production
 Samuel Charters – supervision
 Rudy Van Gelder – engineer

References

Reverend Gary Davis albums
1964 albums
Prestige Records albums
Albums recorded at Van Gelder Studio